János József Székely (born 13 May 1983) is a Romanian former footballer who played as a right winger.

Career
Born in Timișoara of Hungarian heritage, he started his football career with local club Politehnica Timișoara, where he played 8 matches in Liga II between 2000 and 2002.

In 2003, he was bought by Universitatea Cluj for which he played 90 matches and managing to score 22 goals. After his good performance in Liga II Petre Grigoraş, coaching Oțelul Galați at that time, decided to transfer him. He debuted for Oțelul Galați in a cup match against Steaua. His first match in Liga I, in February 2007, was a victory against Unirea Urziceni.

Steaua București
On 6 May 2008 he signed a five-year contract with Steaua București, with a reported transfer fee of around 1,500,000 euro and the midfielder would earn 200,000 euros for season.

On 23 July 2009 he scored the first goal of the second leg against Újpest FC, victory which enabled Steaua's qualification in the next round.

Szekely was released from Steaua in June 2011, and then signed a contract for two and a half years with Volga Nizhny Novgorod, in the Russian Premier League.

Korona Kielce
On 22 August 2012 Korona Kielce announced that Szekely would become a player for the Polish Ekstraklasa club. He signed a one-year contract.

Titles

References

External links
 
 

1983 births
Living people
Sportspeople from Timișoara
Romanian sportspeople of Hungarian descent
Romanian footballers
Association football midfielders
Liga I players
ASC Oțelul Galați players
FC Steaua București players
FC Brașov (1936) players
ASA 2013 Târgu Mureș players
Liga II players
FC Politehnica Timișoara players
FC Universitatea Cluj players
FC Steaua II București players
Russian Premier League players
FC Volga Nizhny Novgorod players
Ekstraklasa players
Korona Kielce players
U.S. 1913 Seregno Calcio players
Calcio Lecco 1912 players
Romanian expatriate footballers
Romanian expatriate sportspeople in Russia
Expatriate footballers in Russia
Romanian expatriate sportspeople in Poland
Expatriate footballers in Poland
Romanian expatriate sportspeople in Italy
Expatriate footballers in Italy